The 1998 Canadian Grand Prix was a Formula One motor race held at Circuit Gilles Villeneuve on 7 June 1998. The 69-lap race was the seventh round of the 1998 FIA Formula One World Championship. It was won by Michael Schumacher, however the race is probably best remembered for the crash on the first lap involving Alexander Wurz, Jean Alesi and Jarno Trulli, which resulted in the race being red flagged and restarted, only for another collision to take place between Alesi and Trulli at the same corner, and the race being started once again under the safety car.

Report

Qualifying
In Montreal, David Coulthard secured his third pole position of the season. The Scotsman managed to do the fastest time at the very end of the session. Mika Häkkinen was very unlucky during the qualifying session. He encountered a lot of traffic during his quick laps. Michael Schumacher was third, and was happily surprised by his lap time which was only 0.2 seconds behind Coulthard's time. The night before qualifying, Eddie Irvine had released a comment saying that the Canadian Grand Prix would be crucial for Ferrari, with Schumacher expressing the same opinion.

Race
At the start of the race Michael Schumacher started brilliantly and overtook Mika Häkkinen, whilst his brother Ralf Schumacher stalled. It took two attempts to get the race started as Alexander Wurz precipitated a collision, which somersaulted his Benetton above the gravel trap, into the first turn and involving Jean Alesi and Jarno Trulli as well. This carnage brought out the red flag. The race was stopped and Alesi, Wurz and Trulli all took the restart in their spare cars. Herbert was lucky that his mechanics were able to repair his Sauber, as Alesi took the spare. The only damage to the car proved to be a bent suspension arm.

At the second start, Michael Schumacher's Ferrari got a poor start, and was instantly overtaken by Giancarlo Fisichella. Häkkinen's gearbox jammed while further back there was another incident. This time it was Ralf Schumacher who was pushing too hard; he also went across the grass and spun in the middle of the track and then pulled off the track with a broken gearbox. This caused mayhem in the pack behind him. Trulli mounted Alesi's car and in total five cars retired after the second start: Häkkinen (gearbox), Ralf Schumacher (spun off), Alesi and Trulli who were involved in the accident, and Toranosuke Takagi who had transmission problems.

Michael Schumacher managed to overtake Giancarlo Fisichella on the first lap but due to all the retirements the safety car was sent out. After five laps, the safety car came back in and the order was, David Coulthard followed by Schumacher, Fisichella, Jacques Villeneuve, Rubens Barrichello, and Heinz-Harald Frentzen.

As the race got under way again, Coulthard and Michael Schumacher started to pull away from the rest of the field. Coulthard led for the first 13 laps until the safety car came out for the second time. Pedro Diniz had gone off the track and when he rejoined he threw a lot of grass and dirt on to the circuit that needed to be removed. When the safety car went back in, there were another three retirements. Mika Salo collided with Johnny Herbert who went off for the second time, and Coulthard had a transmission problem caused by a throttle linkage failure while battling Michael Schumacher for the lead.

The accident involving Salo and Herbert sent out the safety car for a third time, and Michael Schumacher took advantage by making a pitstop. When he got back out and yellow flags were waved to show that there was to be no overtaking, coming out of the pit lane on lap 20 Schumacher shot across to block Frentzen for turn one. Frentzen steered off the track and onto the grass and spun into the gravel at the end of turn one to retire from the Grand Prix.

Williams team principal, Patrick Head, furious at what had just happened, went to Ferrari team principal Jean Todt to have strong words with him about the racing incident: "We [Williams] will do everything to get him [Schumacher] thrown out of this race and no we will not tolerate it".

As the restart Fisichella led, ahead of Villeneuve, Michael Schumacher, Damon Hill, Magnussen and Shinji Nakano. Villeneuve immediately tried to go around the outside of Fisichella and take the lead, but he got it all wrong, went off the track and damaged his rear wing. On lap 35, Schumacher was given a 10-second stop-and-go penalty due to the 'incident' with Frentzen. This momentarily put him behind Hill, but Schumacher overtook him and regained second place on lap 38. Damon Hill had eventually retired on lap 43 with the result of an electrical problem. Then he took the lead on lap 45 when Fisichella went in for his only pit stop. Schumacher then extended his lead over the rest of the pack, and by the time he made his second pit stop to refuel he was able to hold on to his first place, and subsequently finish the race with 16 seconds between himself and second-place finisher Fisichella. Jan Magnussen finished sixth, scoring his only Formula One point in his last Grand Prix.

Classification

Qualifying

Race

Championship standings after the race

Drivers'  Championship standings

Constructors'   Championship standings

 Note: Only the top five positions are included for both sets of standings.

References

Canadian Grand Prix
Canadian Grand Prix
Grand Prix
1990s in Montreal
1998 in Quebec
Grand Prix